Desisopsis maculata is a species of beetle in the family Cerambycidae. It was described by Karl-Ernst Hüdepohl in 1995.

References

Pteropliini
Beetles described in 1995